Fireweed (Epilobium angustifolium or Chamaenerion angustifolium) is a perennial herbaceous plant in the willowherb family (Onagraceae).

Fireweed: may also refer to:

Plants
 A species of plant in the genus Chamaenerion
 A common name for Erechtites hieraciifolius, a plant in the sunflower family
 A common name for Senecio madagascariensis in Australia and Hawaii
 Crassocephalum crepidioides (ebolo), an annual herbaceous plant in the sunflower family (Asteraceae)
 Mexican fireweed, Bassia scoparia, a shrub in family Amaranthaceae
 Apalochlamys spectabilis, a plant in the family Asteraceae, from Australia
 A folk name for dodder
 Chamaenerion latifolium, known as dwarf fireweed

Other uses
 Lyngbya majuscula, a cyanobacterium
 Fireweed (periodical), a feminist literary magazine founded in Toronto, Canada, in 1978